Neiva Province was one of the provinces of Gran Colombia. With the 1824 changes in the subdivisions of Gran Colombia, it became part of the Cundinamarca Department.

Provinces of Gran Colombia
Provinces of the Republic of New Granada